Ernest Valeev (born 7 April 1950, Kirov, Kirov Oblast) is a Russian political figure and a deputy of the 5th, 6th, 7th, and 8th State Dumas.
 
At the age of 18, Valeev served at the Soviet Armed Forces. After graduating from the Ural State Law University in 1974, he was sent by distribution to the Tyumen Oblast to work at the local prosecutor's office. In 1976, he became the prosecutor of the Yurginsky District. From 1988 to 1993, he served as First Deputy District Attorney. From 1993 to 2007, he was the prosecutor of the Tyumen Oblast. He left the post on 2 February 2007, as he was appointed an advisor to the Deputy Prosecutor General of the Russian Federation Yury Chaika. On 4 December 2011, he was elected deputy of the 6th State Duma from the Tyumen Oblast constituency. In 2016 and 2021, he was re-elected for the 7th, and 8th State Dumas, respectively.

References
 

 

1960 births
Living people
United Russia politicians
21st-century Russian politicians
Eighth convocation members of the State Duma (Russian Federation)
Seventh convocation members of the State Duma (Russian Federation)
Sixth convocation members of the State Duma (Russian Federation)